Uromenus is a genus of bush crickets in the sub-family Bradyporinae and tribe Ephippigerini.

Distribution and Description
Species in this genus are found throughout much of mainland Europe and northern Africa.  The type species U. rugosicollis occurs in Western Europe and was originally placed in the similar genus Ephippiger; it is distinguished from the latter by its pronotum, which has side keels in rear half, forming a distinct angle between top and sides. These insects are also apterous and the female ovipositors are up-curved towards tip.

Species

Orthoptera Species File (OSF) lists:

One species group is listed in OSF: the Uromenus poncyi species group, which contains U. poncyi, U. angustelaminatus, and U. silviae.

References

External links
 Video of the rough-backed bush cricket Uromenus rugosicollis feeding (Vendée, France)
 

Bradyporinae
Tettigoniidae genera
Orthoptera of Europe